Pristimantis pulvinatus is a species of frog in the family Strabomantidae.
It is found in French Guiana, Guyana, Venezuela, and possibly Brazil.
Its natural habitats are tropical moist lowland forests and moist montane forests.

References

pulvinatus
Amphibians of French Guiana
Amphibians of Guyana
Amphibians of Venezuela
Amphibians described in 1968
Taxonomy articles created by Polbot